Down on Sunset is the title of the third studio album by singer-songwriter & producer Thomas Anders, released in 1992. It is produced by Ralf Stemmann and Christian De Walden (Brigitte Nielsen) and contains Neil Sedaka's classic Laughter in the Rain. Several songs were co-written by Thomas Anders aka Chris Copperfield.
The same year the album was re-released in Japan.
How Deep Is Your Love and Standing Alone (duet with Glenn Medeiros) were released as singles. 
In 1995 My One And Only was covered in Spanish by Kiara and How Deep Is Your Love was covered by Danny de Munk.
In 1998 this album was re-released as How Deep Is Your Love by Spectrum and Universal.

Track listing

 "How Deep Is Your Love" (Marc Cassandra/ Chris Copperfield, Marc Cassandra, Mike Shepstone) – 4:06
 "You Have Rescued Me" (Mimmo Castelli, Chris Copperfield / Mike Shepstone, Chris Copperfield) – 3:51
 "My One And Only" (Steve Singer, Lisa Catherine Cohen, Aides Hidding) – 4:04
 "Across The World Tonight" (Steve Singer/Mike Shepstone) – 4:48
 "Standing Alone" (Duet With Glenn Medeiros) (Rick Lane, Lee York/Mike Shepstone) – 3:59
 "Laughter In The Rain" (Neil Sedaka/Phil Cody) – 3:15
 "Turn Around" (Mimmo Castelli, Ralf Stemmann, Chris Copperfield / Mike Shepstone, Chris Copperfield) – 3:57
 "If You Could Only See Me Now" (Ralf Stemmann/ Chris Copperfield, Mike Shepstone) – 3:48
 "A Little At A Time" (Austin Roberts, Todd Cerney, Nat Kipner) – 3:36
 "Thru With Love" (Marc Cassandra, Chris Copperfield / Mike Shepstone, Chris Copperfield) – 4:22
 "Cruising Down On Sunset" (Marc Cassandra, Chris Copperfield, Ralf Stemmann/Mike Shepstone, Marc Anderson) – 3:09

Personnel 

 Produced and arranged by: Christian De Walden and Ralf Stemmann
 Recorded and Mixed by: Walter Clissen
 Recorded at Flamingo Café Recording Studio, Los Angeles
 Mixed at Ground Control Studios, Santa Monica, California
 Engineered by: Walter Clissen, assisted by Jimmy Busceme and Esteban Cavoti
 Digitally mastered by: Brian Gardner at Bernie Grundman Mastering, Hollywood
 Cover-Design: PS Grafik, Hamburg
 Photos: Thomas Muller

Musicians 

 Synclavier programming: Ralf Stemmann
 Keyboards and Synthesizers: Ralf Stemmann and Patrick Moraz
 Acoustic piano: Patrick Moraz, Larry Steelman
 Guitars: Tim Pierce
 Acoustic Guitars: Tim Pierce, Ramon Stagnaro
 Bass: Bob Parr
 Sax and Flute solo: Doug Norwine
 Horns: "The Heart Attack Horns" Bill Bergman, Greg Smith, Roy Wiegand, Dennis Farias and Nick Lane
 Percussion: Paulinho Da Costa
 Stings: "LA Express Strings"
 Background vocals arrangements: Christian De Walden
 Background vocals: Eric Paletti, Daniel O'Brien, Warren Ham, Michael Mishaw, Kenny O'Brien
 Radio Announcer: Banana Joe (appears courtesy of Premiere Radio Networks)

Music videos

 Standing Alone (duet with Glenn Medeiros) was released as a music video and featured on Thomas Anders – The DVD-Collection.

References

See also

Brigitte Nielsen – I'm The One... Nobody Else (1992)

1992 albums
Thomas Anders albums
Polydor Records albums